Zimzelen Glacier is the 3.7 km long and 2.5 km wide glacier on Pefaur (Ventimiglia) Peninsula, Danco Coast on the west side of Antarctic Peninsula, situated east of Krapets Glacier and west of Blériot Glacier  It drains northwards, and flowing into the east arm of Salvesen Cove.

The glacier is named after the settlement of Zimzelen in Southern Bulgaria.

Location
British mapping in 1978.

Maps
 British Antarctic Territory.  Scale 1:200000 topographic map. DOS 610 Series, Sheet W 64 60.  Directorate of Overseas Surveys, Tolworth, UK, 1978.
 Antarctic Digital Database (ADD). Scale 1:250000 topographic map of Antarctica. Scientific Committee on Antarctic Research (SCAR). Since 1993, regularly upgraded and updated.

References
 Bulgarian Antarctic Gazetteer. Antarctic Place-names Commission. (details in Bulgarian, basic data in English)
 Zimzelen Glacier. SCAR Composite Gazetteer of Antarctica

External links
 Zimzelen Glacier. Copernix satellite image

Glaciers of Danco Coast
Bulgaria and the Antarctic